The House Theatre of Chicago is a non-profit, ensemble theatre company in Chicago, IL. The House was founded in 2001 by a group of friends from the British American Drama Academy and Southern Methodist University with the mission of exploring the ideas of Community and Storytelling in order to create a unique theatrical experience for audience members. Since becoming eligible in 2004, The House has been nominated for more than 40 Joseph Jefferson Awards. In 2007, The House became the first recipient of Broadway in Chicago's Emerging Theater Award. Performances currently take place at the Chopin Theatre in Wicker Park.

History

The House staged its first show, Death and Harry Houdini at the Live Bait Theatre in the Fall of 2001. Artistic Director Nathan Allen wrote and directed the show which starred company member Dennis Watkins in the title role.

The team followed with the critically acclaimed hit, The Terrible Tragedy of Peter Pan. Allen directed the production, written by company member Phillip C. Klapperich. The show was extended twice, running for five months.

The genre-bending Valentine Trilogy spanned three seasons and established the House's dedication to exploring the ideas of Community and Heroes through Storytelling and the use of music. The trilogy began with the critically acclaimed opening chapter of the Valentine Trilogy, San Valentino and the Melancholy Kid in winter 2004. Playwright and songwriter Allen crafted an epic rock 'n’ roll drama about a small band of cowboys who hit the open range with more than cattle herding on their minds. A year later the company transported the story to feudal Japan for the samurai sequel, Curse of the Crying Heart. In 2006 the company mounted the concluding chapter, Valentine Victorious, which found reluctant hero Elliot Dodge taking on the corrupt streets of 1930s Chicago while battling his own demons.

The House found critical success again in 2006 with The Sparrow. Chicago Tribune Theatre Critic called it "a fresh, guileless, quirky and entirely lovable celebration of high school memories and small-town goodness, told in the accessible, youthful spirit of the iconic comic book." Following a sold-out run at the Steppenwolf Merle Reskin Garage Theater, the House remounted the show the following season at the Apollo Theatre.

The House Creative Team collaborated with the American Music Theatre Project and students at Northwestern University to develop the new musical Girls vs. Boys. The show premiered at the House in April 2010.

In 2014, The House was awarded the American Theatre Wing's National Theatre Company Grant.

In October 2020, Nate Allen announced that he was stepping down from his role as the House's Artistic Director. (He was the only person to hold this position in the company's twenty-year history.) This announcement followed the cancellation of House escape room productions Nova to Lodestar and The Last Defender.  The COVID-19 pandemic had already force-furloughed most House staff. Allen estimated that the company could survive for another year under pandemic-related limitations, but he explained "what the House deserves is someone to really rebuild a company. I know what that is, but it’s not me. That was a commitment I had in my 20s, but I don’t have it now." Allen had immeasurable influence on the House and also on several generations of Chicago artists who encountered theatre through the House's signature maximalist style.

Production history

Past Seasons
 Season Zero
Death & Harry Houdini '01
The Terrible Tragedy of Peter Pan
 Season One
Death & Harry Houdini '03
San Valentino and the Melancholy Kid
The Rocket Man
 Season Two
Cave With Man
Curse of the Crying Heart
Dave DaVinci Saves the Universe
 Season Three
The Great and Terrible Wizard of Oz
Valentine Victorious
The Boy Detective Fails
 Season Four
Hope Springs Infernal
The Sparrow
Hatfield & McCoy
Pop Theatre At The Old Town School
 Season Five
The Magnificents
The Nutcracker
The Attempters
The Sparrow Returns
The Secret Order of The Magic Pearl
 Season Six
Dave Davinci Saves the Universe
Rose and the Rime
 Season Seven
All the Fame of Lofty Deeds
Wilson Wants It All
Girls vs. Boys
The Sparrow (Limited Engagement at Miami's Adrienne Arsht Center for the Performing Arts April 7-May 1, 2011)
Season Eight
Thieves Like Us
Star Witness
The Nutcracker
Odradek
 Other Productions
Ellen Under Glass
A Midsommer Night's Dreame
Alice
The Care Bears Movie: Live in Concert
Newsies: Live in Concert
Tremors: Edited for TV
Nice Guys Finish Last: Collaboraction's Fable Party
Defy Gravity: Museum of Science and Industry
Millennium Park Audio Installation
Beginners Guide to Camping
San Valentino and the Melancholy Kid: Theatre on The Lake
Curse of the Crying Heart: Theatre on The Lake
The Great and Terrible Wizard of Oz: Northlight Theatre
Hero, Dragon, Pearl: The First Annual Gathering of The Secret Order of The Magic Pearl

References

Theatre companies in Chicago